The  is a Bo-Bo wheel arrangement electric locomotive type operated by private railway operator Nagoya Railroad (Meitetsu) in Japan. The locomotives were used primarily on track maintenance trains, but following their withdrawal in 2014, only one locomotive, DeKi 303, remains in use, limited to depot shunting duties at Meitetsu's Maigi Maintenance Depot.

History
The locomotives were built between 1926 and 1929 for the Mikawa Railroad, and classified Class Ki 10. Locomotives Ki 10 and Ki 11 were built by Nippon Sharyo, and locomotives Ki 12 to Ki 14 were built by Mitsubishi Shipbuilding (now part of Mitsubishi Heavy Industries. A sixth locomotive, Ki 15, was added to the fleet with the purchase of former Ichibata Electric Railway DeKi 1, built in 1923 by Mitsubishi. The locomotives were reclassified DeKi 300 following the merger of Mikawa Railroad into Nagoya Railroad (Meitetsu) in 1941.

Originally painted in black, the locomotives were repainted into "Meitetsu Blue" when they underwent life extension refurbishment in 1993.

Withdrawals
DeKi 304 was scrapped following fire damage in 1964. DeKi 301 was scrapped following damage sustained in a level crossing accident in 1966. DeKi 302 was withdrawn in 1984, after becoming surplus to requirements due to the reduction in freight operations.

The last three locomotives in service, DeKi 303, 305, and 306, were withdrawn from main line service in March 2014. While DeKi 305 and 306 were cut up, DeKi 303 remains in use as an internal shunting locomotive at Meitetsu's Maigi Maintenance Depot.

Preserved examples
DeKi 302 was preserved in a park in the city of Toyota, following its withdrawal in 1984, but it was cut up in 2003.

References

1067 mm gauge locomotives of Japan
Electric locomotives of Japan
DeKi 300
1500 V DC locomotives
Railway locomotives introduced in 1923
Bo-Bo locomotives
Nippon Sharyo locomotives